Sir Francis Lycett (1803 – 29 October 1880) was a British businessman and philanthropist, and a prominent member of the Methodist Church.

Born in Worcester, he was the son of Philip Francis Lycett and his wife Mary. Following education at a private school in Worcester, he initially entered employment in the family glove works. In 1832 he became the London manager of Dent, Allcroft & Co., a large Worcester glove-making business. He was based in the City of London and became a member of the city's corporation.

In 1847 he became a partner in Dent Allcroft, retiring from business in 1865. He continued his association with the City of London: in 1866 he was elected as one of the two Sheriffs of London and Middlesex. He was knighted in 1867, became a justice of the peace for Middlesex and a Deputy Lieutenant for the City of London in 1869.

On 16 June 1869 Sir Francis Lycett laid the foundation stone of the Methodist church in the village of Wye in Kent.

A Liberal in politics, he made a number of unsuccessful attempts to enter parliament including at Liskeard in 1869 and St Ives in 1874 and Worcester in 1878. In 1870 he was elected to the first London School Board, as one of the members representing Finsbury.

In 1837 he married Amelia Sarah Emily Vanderpant, daughter of John Vanderpant of Utrecht in the Netherlands.

Lycett died in October 1880, at his home at 18 Highbury Grove, Islington, aged 77 and was buried on the western side of Highgate Cemetery. He left an estate of more than a quarter of a million pounds, much of which he willed to various Methodist charities.

References

1803 births
1880 deaths
Burials at Highgate Cemetery
Deputy Lieutenants of the City of London
Liberal Party (UK) parliamentary candidates
Members of the London School Board
Business people from Worcester, England